André Prévost may refer to:
André Prévost (tennis) (1860–1919), French tennis player
André Prévost (composer) (1934–2001), Canadian composer and teacher